Rubus meracus is a North American species of dewberry in section Procumbentes (formerly Flagellares) of the genus Rubus, a member of the rose family.  It grows in the central United States, in the central Mississippi and Ohio Valleys and the Great Lakes region.

References

External links
Photo of herbarium specimen at Missouri Botanical Garden, collected in Missouri in 1909

meracus
Plants described in 1943
Flora of the United States